The Baka are an ethnic group from the Democratic Republic of the Congo and Western Equatoria in South Sudan. They are mainly Christian and number about 25,000 people (1993).

References

Ethnic groups in the Democratic Republic of the Congo
Ethnic groups in South Sudan
Democratic Republic of the Congo–South Sudan relations